Kerbela is a genus of moths of the family Crambidae.

Species
Kerbela monotona Amsel, 1949
Kerbela turcomanica (Christoph, 1877)

References

Odontiinae
Crambidae genera
Taxa named by Hans Georg Amsel